Okubovirus is a genus of viruses in the order Caudovirales, in the family Herelleviridae, in the subfamily Spounavirinae. Bacteria serve as natural hosts. There are two species in this genus.

Taxonomy
The following two species are assigned to the genus:
 Bacillus virus Camphawk
 Bacillus virus SPO1

Structure
Viruses in Okubovirus are non-enveloped, with head-tail geometries, and T=16 symmetry. The diameter is around 108 nm, with a length of 140 nm. Genomes are linear, around 145kb in length. The genome codes for 200 proteins.

Life cycle
Viral replication is cytoplasmic. Entry into the host cell is achieved by adsorption into the host cell. DNA-templated transcription is the method of transcription. Bacteria serve as the natural host. Transmission routes are passive diffusion.

Taxonomic history
 Bacillus phage SP8 was assigned to the family Myoviridae in 1995.
 Bacillus phage SPO1 was assigned to the genus SPO1-like phages in 1996 as type species.
 Myoviridae were assigned to the order Caudovirales in 1998
 SPO1-like phages were renamed SPO1-like viruses in 1999
 Bacillus phage SP8 was merged into Bacillus phage SPO1 in 1999 (as type species) of SPO1-like viruses.
 SPO1-like viruses were assigned to the sub-family Spounavirinae (of Caudovirales) in 2011.
 SPO1-like viruses were renamed Spounalikevirus in 2012.
 Spounalikevirus was renamed to Spo1virus in 2015.
 Spo1virus was renamed to Okubovirus in 2018.

References

External links
 Viralzone: Spounalikevirus
 ICTV Report: Herelleviridae

Virus genera
Spounavirinae
Bacillus phages